Stanley Chesney (January 19, 1910 in Bayonne, New Jersey – January 1978, in Bayonne, New Jersey) was an all around athlete best known as a U.S. soccer goalkeeper.  He played in both the first and second American Soccer League and was inducted into the National Soccer Hall of Fame in 1966.  Beyond soccer Stan was signed out of Bayonne High School by the legendary Branch Rickey to play baseball for the St. Louis Cardinals organization and played Firstbase in the Three "I" League.  Stan also led his semi-pro NJ basketball team in scoring and was a local handball champion.  

According to the National Soccer Hall of Fame, Chesney signed with the Bayonne Rovers when he was seventeen.  At some point, he also played for Babcock & Wilcox.  However, there are no records of these teams competing in the mid to late 1920s.  At some point, he signed with the New York Americans of the first American Soccer League.  He saw time in three games with the Americans during the fall 1931 ASL season.  Chesney had a remarkable 17-year career with the Americans.  In 1933, they fell to Stix, Baer and Fuller F.C. in the final of the National Challenge Cup.  In 1937, they won the cup over St. Louis Shamrocks.  The Americans also won the 1936 ASL championship.  At some point in the mid-1940s, Chesney may have retired as he came out of retirement in 1948 to rejoin the New York Americans

External links
 National Soccer Hall of Fame profile

References

1910 births
1978 deaths
Association football goalkeepers
American soccer players
Babcock & Wilcox F.C. players
American Soccer League (1921–1933) players
American Soccer League (1933–1983) players
New York Americans (soccer) (1933–1956) players
National Soccer Hall of Fame members